Ricardo is a daily French-language cooking show that airs weekdays on Radio-Canada and is hosted by Ricardo Larrivée. He presents accessible recipes alone or accompanied by a guest or a member of his rotating panel of contributors: nutritionists Hélène Laurendeau and Christina Blais, gardener Pierre Gingras and sommelier François Chartier.

The show moved in 2006 from a television studio to a purpose-built kitchen in Ricardo's home in Chambly, Quebec.

Ricardo spun off Ricardo and Friends, an English-language adaptation of the series

Television shows filmed in Quebec
Ici Radio-Canada Télé original programming
2000s Canadian cooking television series
Chambly, Quebec
2002 Canadian television series debuts
2002 establishments in Quebec